Bechtsrieth is a municipality in the administrative district of Neustadt an der Waldnaab in Bavaria in Germany. It has 1,051 inhabitants, of which the males make up 48.6% (511) and the females, 51.4% (540).

References

Neustadt an der Waldnaab (district)
Upper Palatine Forest